"Alone I Break" is a song written and recorded by the American nu metal band Korn for their fifth studio album Untouchables. It was released as the album's third single in November 2002.

Chart performance
"Alone I Break" failed to gain as much airplay as the first two singles from Untouchables, barely cracking the top twenty of Billboard'''s Mainstream Rock Songs chart in December 2002.

Charts

Live performance
The song was played during a few shows on the Pop Sux! Tour supporting the release of Untouchables in 2002, but was quickly scrapped due to difficulties in performing it live. However, Jonathan Davis did perform the song on his Alone I Play tour in 2007. Korn played "Alone I Break" live again for the first time in nine years in Bloomington, Illinois, during the first date of the Music as a Weapon V Tour, on January 14, 2011.

Music video
MTV supported a contest and a special program entitled mtvTREATMENT'' in which the winner, 25 year old Sean Dack, was chosen to direct the video for "Alone I Break." It was shot in the form of a reality television show in which Korn singer Jonathan Davis kills members of the band. The video starts with the band performing in the downstairs foyer. Part way through the song, Jonathan turns towards Munky (James Shaffer) and acts aggressively towards him. This then leads to a short scuffle between the two, as Fieldy (Reggie Arvizu) breaks up the fight. Davis storms out, and is seen throwing things around in his room, apparently enraged. Meanwhile, Munky takes a bath but soon falls asleep, as Davis finds a lamp nearby and pushes it into the tub, electrocuting and killing him. Brian Welch is then seen looking around as the lights flicker on and off, implying that this is happening while Munky is being killed. On the balcony he speaks to someone on his cell phone, unaware that Davis is approaching. Davis pushes Welch off the ledge, killing him. David Silveria is seen sleeping with two women as Davis creeps in with a pillow. Davis quietly suffocates Silveria and leaves. He moves downstairs, where Fieldy is cooking spaghetti in the kitchen. Davis takes out a bottle of rat poison from a cupboard and waits. Fieldy goes into the pantry to fetch some more ingredients, as Davis pours rat poison in the sauce. Fieldy serves himself and dies. Davis walks outside toward the cameraman, who falls dead.

Notes

External links
 Lyrics

2002 singles
2001 songs
Korn songs
Rock ballads
Songs written by Reginald Arvizu
Songs written by Jonathan Davis
Songs written by James Shaffer
Songs written by David Silveria
Songs written by Brian Welch
Song recordings produced by Michael Beinhorn
Immortal Records singles